Judge Pollard may refer to:

Robert Nelson Pollard (1880–1954), judge of the United States District Court for the Eastern District of Virginia
William B. Pollard III (born 1947), judge of the United States Court of Military Commission Review

See also
Sir Lewis Pollard (c. 1465–1526), British justice of the Common Pleas